Kizhavaneri is a small village located about 50 km away from Tirunelveli, south part of Tamil Nadu, India. It is an old village and the people living here are staying more than 500 years. The village is famous for St. Anne's Church which is located in the center of the village.

Geography
Kizhavaneri is located 4 km East to Vadakkuvalliyur, and 1 km away from Thiruchendur Road

Landmark
Saint Anne's Church, Kizhavaneri parish comes under Roman Catholic Diocese of Tuticorin.

References

Cities and towns in Tirunelveli district